Stéfan Louw is a South African operatic tenor, regarded as one of South Africa's leading tenors. He has been performing opera since 1995.

Biography

While still a student, Louw joined the Pretoria State Theatre Opera Chorus in 1995. In the following year, he received the Chorister of the Year Award. He made his solo debut in 1999 as Beppe in Pagliacci. Louw received the FNB Vita Opera Award for Most Promising Newcomer for his debut role. He remained a member of the chorus until 2001, often performing supporting character roles. In 2000, he became one of the founding members of the Black Tie Ensemble (BTE).

When Louw made his leading-role debut as Cavaradossi in Tosca (2003), he decided to quit his full-time job as a sales person at Incredible Connection to focus on his opera career.

Since then Louw made a living singing opera in South Africa, America, and Europe. Some of the roles he performed over the years include Alfredo in La traviata, Barinkay in The Gypsy Baron, Cavaradossi in Tosca, Von Eisenstein in Die Fledermaus, Hoffmann in The Tales of Hoffmann, Tebaldo in I Capuleti e i Montecchi, the Duke of Mantua in Rigoletto, Tonio in La fille du régiment, Pang in Turandot, Pinkerton in Madama Butterfly, Radames in Aida, Don José in Carmen, Pollione in Norma, Rodolfo in La bohème and the title role in Werther.

Louw has also performed the tenor solo roles of Puccini's Messa di Gloria, Handel's Messiah, Rossini's Stabat Mater and Petite messe solennelle, Beethoven's Ninth Symphony and Missa solemnis as well as Dvorak's Mass in D major at numerous occasions throughout South Africa and Namibia.

Notable Productions

Opera entrepreneur 

In 2003, Louw started producing small opera concerts at churches in-between professional productions. By 2010, his concert series Aria! Opera for Everyone was so popular that it ran for four seasons at the Roodepoort Theatre (2010-2014). These concerts aimed to bring true opera aficionados a measure of quality, whilst at the same time encouraging new audiences to appreciate true opera.

In March 2011, Louw founded his first opera company in Gauteng – Sempre Opera. In February 2013, he handed the reigns to his colleague Linette van der Merwe (mezzo-soprano), who then took over as head of the organisation.

Louw then went ahead to form a second opera company in Gauteng – Big Wig Opera. The company successfully produced three full operas – La Bohème, L'elisir d'amore and Madama Butterfly – in its first year of operations (2015) of which Louw performed in one and directed two.

After spending a year singing in Greece during the 2017/18 season, Louw returned to South Africa and founded The Little Theatre Company, which is based in the Vaal Triangle.

In March 2019 Louw performed his solo show at the Wakkerstroom Music Festival. He has performed at many of South Africa's art festivals like the Klein Karoo Nasionale Kunstefees.

When his wife, Marisa, fell ill in August 2019, Louw embarked on doing solo performances at private events to raise funds for her treatments. When the COVID-19 pandemic put a halt to his efforts to raise funds with concerts, he created a fund-raising campaign. Most recently, as the COVID-19 restrictions eased, he embarked on producing small-scale productions and concerts that include house concerts at his home in Parys.

Vocal coach 
At the start of 2019, he founded the Stéfan Louw School of Singing in Parys. Here Louw teaches children (10+) and adults the basic principles of singing. Although an opera singer, he does not exclusively teach opera techniques. Students can apply the methods to any genre of music, from jazz to pop and R&B.

Opera repertoire 
 Alfredo in La traviata
 Calaf in Turandot
 Canio in Pagliacci
 Cavaradossi in Tosca
 Don José in Carmen
 Hoffmann in Les contes d'Hoffmann
 Manrico in Il trovatore
 Otello in Otello
 Pinkerton in Madama Butterfly
 Pollione in Norma
 Radames in Aida
 Rodolfo in La bohème
 The Duke of Mantua in Rigoletto
 Tonio in La fille du régiment
 Von Eisenstein'in Die Fledermaus
 Werther in Werther

Oratorio repertoire 
 Puccini's Messa di Gloria
 Handel's Messiah
 Rossini's Stabat Mater
 Beethoven's Ninth Symphony
 Beethoven's Missa Solemnis
 Dvorak's Mass in D major
 Rossini's Petite messe solennelle
 Mahler's Das Lied von der Erde
 Verdi's Requiem

Personal life 

Louw met his wife, Marisa, in June 1996 when they were both members of the State Theatre Opera Chorus in the opera Tosca. They got married in Gordon's Bay on 20 February 1999. After living in Pretoria and later Johannesburg, they relocated to Parys in April 2012 where they live with their 14 pets. The couple has a tremendous passion for animals and is involved with various rescue organisations. Marisa recently applied for a general environmental permit and started plans to open a bird rehabilitation centre.

When he is not singing or teaching, Louw is an avid PC gamer and specimen carp angler.

References

External links 
 
 Upcoming concerts ticket portal
 YouTube Channel
 Big Wig Opera website
 Big Wig Opera YouTube Channel

South African opera directors
People from Pretoria
South African operatic tenors
20th-century South African male opera singers
21st-century South African male opera singers
Year of birth missing (living people)